Jack Troutman Gougler (November 5, 1888 – April 23, 1961) was an American football coach. He was the tenth head football coach at Dickinson College in Carlisle, Pennsylvania, serving for the first part of the 1910 season, and compiling a record of 3–6.

Gougler was unable to complete the 1910 season and was replaced part way through the season by Thomas Crooks.

References

External links
 

1888 births
1961 deaths
Dickinson Red Devils football coaches
Dickinson Red Devils football players